Vsevolod Mstislavich may refer to: 

Vsevolod Mstislavich of Volhynia, Rurikid, knyaz of Belz (1170–96), knyaz of Volodymyr (1188)
Vsevolod Mstislavich of Novgorod and Pskov Rurikid, knyaz of Novgorod (1117–36), of Vyshgorod (1136), of Pskov (1137–38)